Mustang Flat is a flat in the Diablo Range in Stanislaus County, California.

History
Droves of wild horses were held at Mustang Flat and Paradise Flat and driven up along route of the Long Ridge Road to Mustang Peak to be joined to the droves of the Joaquin Murrieta gang's horses moving southward along La Vereda del Monte(now County Line Road) at Mustang Peak from Valle Atravesado or Valle Hondo.

References 

Landforms of Stanislaus County, California
Diablo Range
La Vereda del Monte